Christian Theodor Weinlig (July 25, 1780 – March 7, 1842) was a German music teacher, composer, and choir conductor, active in Dresden and Leipzig.

Biography
Born in Dresden, Weinlig initially studied and then practised law until 1803. He then began musical training with his uncle Christian Ehregott Weinlig, with whom he studied for two years before travelling to Bologna to study with Stanislao Mattei in 1806. He was a member of the Accademia Filarmonica di Bologna. From 1814 to 1817, he worked as Cantor of the Kreuzkirche in Dresden. In 1823, he became Cantor of the Thomanerchor in Leipzig, an office he kept until his death.

Among his most well-known pupils were pianist Clara Schumann and composer Richard Wagner; he taught Wagner at Saint Thomas school in Leipzig.

In 1877, Wagner recalled Weinlig's teaching style to Edward Dannreuther:

References

Sources
 
 

1780 births
1842 deaths
19th-century classical composers
19th-century German composers
19th-century German male musicians
German conductors (music)
German male classical composers
German male conductors (music)
German Romantic composers
Musicians from Dresden
Thomaskantors